Ján Ďurica (born 10 December 1981) is a Slovak former professional footballer who played as a central defender. He worked as assistant manager of FC Petržalka.

Club career
Ďurica moved to FC Saturn Moscow Oblast after a highly successful UEFA Champions League campaign with FC Artmedia Bratislava. On 31 January 2009, Ďurica signed a three-year contract with Lokomotiv Moscow, who have paid around €3.5 million to overtake Celtic and Panathinaikos in the auction for the Slovakia national. On 13 January 2010, it was confirmed that he would join Hannover 96 on-loan until the end of the season.

International career
On 9 July 2004, Ďurica made his national team debut against Japan at the 2004 Kirin Cup. He was picked for the Slovak squad for their first FIFA World Cup ever, held in South Africa. He played all four matches at the 2010 FIFA World Cup. He also remained a regular center-back for the upcoming years, forming a solid defensive duo with Martin Škrtel (for a majority of his career - both players debuting in the same match). After contributing to Slovakia's first appearance at a UEFA European Championship he was one of the players who completed all of Slovakia's four matches of the tournament. After the tournament, he hinted the intention to retire from international football after the 2018 FIFA World Cup in Russia, where he spent a notable part of his career. However, as Slovakia failed to qualify, Ďurica retired on 14 November 2017, in a home friendly match against Norway (1–0 win), with a final statistic of 91 caps and 4 goals.

Career statistics

Club

International
Scores and results list Slovakia's goal tally first, score column indicates score after each Ďurica goal.

Personal life
Born in Dunajská Streda, he belongs to the Hungarian minority in Slovakia through her mother.

Honours
Artmedia Petržalka
Slovak Cup: 2003–04
Slovak Superliga: 2004–05

Lokomotiv Moscow
Russian Cup: 2014–15

Individual
 List of 33 top players of the Russian league: #1 (2007), #2 (2013–14)

References

External links

 
 
 

Living people
1981 births
Sportspeople from Dunajská Streda
Slovak footballers
Slovak people of Hungarian descent
Association football central defenders
Slovakia international footballers
2010 FIFA World Cup players
UEFA Euro 2016 players
FC DAC 1904 Dunajská Streda players
FC Petržalka players
FC Saturn Ramenskoye players
FC Lokomotiv Moscow players
Hannover 96 players
Trabzonspor footballers
FK Dukla Prague players
Slovak Super Liga players
Russian Premier League players
Bundesliga players
Süper Lig players
Slovak expatriate footballers
Slovak expatriate sportspeople in Russia
Expatriate footballers in Russia
Slovak expatriate sportspeople in Germany
Expatriate footballers in Germany
Slovak expatriate sportspeople in Turkey
Expatriate footballers in Turkey
Expatriate footballers in the Czech Republic